The Académie catholique Ange-Gabriel is a French school in the city of Brockville, Ontario, Canada. It is part of the Conseil des écoles catholiques du Centre-Est school board and offers instruction from junior kindergarten to grade 12. It has a population of 350 students.

History 
The school was established in 1995 based on the recognition of the need for a French language school within the city. The first official location of the school was on Sharpes Lane off Highway 2 East and was successful from the start. In 2005 the school moved to its current home in a brand-new building on Kensington Parkway, three times bigger than the old school, and with space for a Centre des Enfants (day care).

References

External links

 Ange-Gabriel Official School Website 

French-language high schools in Ontario
French-language elementary schools in Ontario
Catholic secondary schools in Ontario
Educational institutions established in 1995
Catholic elementary schools in Ontario
1995 establishments in Ontario
Education in Brockville